is a Japanese athlete who specialised in the 400 metres hurdles. He represented his country at the 2011 World Championships without qualifying for the semifinals. In addition, he won the silver medal at the 2011 Asian Championships.

His personal best in the event is 49.27 set in Osaka in 2011.

Competition record

References

1987 births
Living people
People from Chiba (city)
Japanese male hurdlers
World Athletics Championships athletes for Japan
21st-century Japanese people